The Young Girl (Den muso) is a 1975 Mali film, directed by Souleymane Cissé.

Plot
A young mute woman is raped and becomes pregnant, with disastrous consequences within her family. The film also sketches the social/economic situation in urban Mali in the 1970s, particularly in relation to the treatment with women.

Cast
Dounamba Dany Coulibaly
Fanta Diabate
Omou Diarra
Balla Moussa Keita
Mamoulou Sanogo

External links

1975 films
Malian drama films
Films directed by Souleymane Cissé